Helix lucorum is a species of large, edible, air-breathing land snail, a terrestrial pulmonate gastropod mollusk in the family Helicidae, the typical snails.

Description 

Adult snails weigh about 20-25 g.

The width of the shell is 35-60 mm. The height of the shell is 25–45 mm.

This species of snail makes and uses love darts.

Distribution
The native distribution is the Caucasus, Anatolia and, arguably, the Balkans. It has also invaded many other regions since ancient times, likely assisted by humans.

Eastern native range with main genetic diversity of the species:
 Anatolia (Turkey)
 Georgia
 Azerbaijan
 Armenia
 Northern Iran

Balkans (probably native):
 Albania
 Bosnia and Herzegovina
 Bulgaria
 Croatia
 Greece
 Macedonia
 Serbia
 Turkey

Other countries:
 Israel<ref>Commonwealth of Australia (2002 April). "[http://www.daff.gov.au/__data/assets/pdf_file/0015/24702/fin_egyptian_citrus.pdf Citrus Imports from the Arab Republic of Egypt. A Review Under Existing Import Conditions for Citrus from Israel] ". Agriculture, Fisheries and Forestry, Australia. Caption: Gastropods, page 12 and Appendix 2.</ref>
 Syria
 Russia - could be native in Caucasus, invasive in some other regions
 Italy - probably invasive
 Hungary - probably invasive
 Romania - probably invasive
 Ukraine - invasive, in Crimea ("Helix taurica Krynicki, 1833") at least since early 19 century, probably much longer, these populations originated from Anatolia; other colonies of a different lineage also appear since 2000s in mainland part of Southern Ukraine and in Crimea as wellBalashov I. & Gural-Sverlova N. (2012). "An annotated checklist of the terrestrial molluscs of Ukraine". Journal of Conchology 41(1): 91-109.
 Czech Republic - invasive, since 2009, as of 2011 the only locality is Prague-ŽižkovPeltanová A., Petrusek A., Kment P. & Juřičková L. (2011). "A fast snail's pace: colonization of Central Europe by Mediterranean gastropods". Biological Invasions 14(4): 759-764. . 
 Slovakia - invasive, since 2013, as of 2014 the only locality is in Bratislava
 France - invasive
 Great Britain - invasive, since 2009, at Wimbledon

 Ecology 
The diameter of the egg is 4.4 mm. Juvenile snails that are two to three months old weigh 0.5-0.9 g.

Human use
Measurement of DNA damage in H. lucorum collected from environmental sites can be used for evaluating soil pollution at these sites.   DNA damage in H. lucorum haemocytes and digestive gland cells is determined by the comet assay.Helix lucorum'' is used in cuisine as escargots.

References

External links

 https://web.archive.org/web/20120529085410/http://szmn.sbras.ru/picts/Mollusca/Helix_lucorum.htm
 TODO SOBRE CARACOLES

Helix (gastropod)
Gastropods described in 1758
Taxa named by Carl Linnaeus